Lady Brabourne College (LBC) is an institution for women's education in Kolkata, India. The college admits undergraduates and post-graduates, and awards degrees from the University of Calcutta. It is a state government administered college and is in one of the more cosmopolitan localities of the city.

History 
Lady Brabourne College was established in July 1939 at a rented house in Park Circus in Calcutta (now Kolkata), following the initiative of the then Prime Minister of Bengal, A. K. Fazlul Huq. It was named after Doreen, Baroness Brabourne, an Anglo-Irish aristocrat who was the wife of The 5th Baron Brabourne, the then Governor of Bengal. 

Lord Brabourne died on 23 February 1939. Sir John Herbert, the next Governor, laid down the foundation stone of the college on 26 August 1939. The college had 50 percent reserved seats for Muslim women and the rest for Hindus, Parsees, Sikhs, Jains and other ethnic communities. 

The hostel facility was kept exclusively for Muslims. The college started admitting Hindu students due to shortage of Muslim students. It has since become difficult for Muslim students to get admission to the college according to the All India Minority Association. In 2017 the college, along with others affiliated with the University of Calcutta, was given the authority to award the degree of doctor of philosophy (Ph.D.).

Notable alumnae and faculty

Arundhati Bhattacharya
Arundhati Ghose
Asima Chatterjee
Beggzadi Mahmuda Nasir
Gouri Dharmapal
Helena Khan
Jahanara Imam
Koena Mitra
Rimi B. Chatterjee
Rituparna Sengupta
Syeda Sakina Islam
Indrani Sen
Srabani Sen
Susmita Basu Majumdar
Nabaneeta Dev Sen
Natasa Dasgupta

See also 
List of colleges affiliated to the University of Calcutta
Education in India
Education in West Bengal

References

External links

Universities and colleges in Kolkata
Women's universities and colleges in West Bengal
University of Calcutta affiliates
Educational institutions established in 1939
1939 establishments in India